The Ginzburg Skyscraper or Ginzburg House was a 12-story, 67.5-meter skyscraper in Kyiv. Known as "Ukraine's first skyscraper," it was completed in 1912 and destroyed in 1941.

History 
The house was built between 1910–1912. It was used as a revenue house. There were 94 apartments in the [skyscraper, the largest of which had 11 rooms. There were about 500 rooms in total.

A shopping center was located on the first floors of Ginzburg's building. The building had a tower offering a panorama of Kyiv.

In the autumn of 1913, the artist Oleksandr Murashko opened the "Art Studio of Oleksandr Murashko" on the 12th floor of the skyscraper, in which almost 100 people studied at the same time. In addition to drawing and painting, lectures were given on the history and philosophy of art. The studio existed until 1917.

In April 1918, the French Military mission of the Ukrainian People's Republic, consisting of 6 officers, was housed in this building.

It was blown up by the retreating Soviet forces in 1941 (following the German invasion of Russia).

The building was blown up by the troops of the NKVD of the USSR on September 24, 1941 and completely destroyed in the early 1950s, when the final dismantling of the foundation of the building was carried out.

In 1954–1961, the Moscow Hotel (since 2001, the Hotel Ukraine) was built on the site of the Ginzburg House.

The building was used in the filming of the experimental Soviet film «Man with a Movie Camera» in 1929, in which the tower and the inner courtyard of the skyscraper were shot.

Gallery

References 

Skyscrapers in Ukraine
Former buildings and structures of Kyiv
1910s architecture
Buildings and structures demolished in 1941